Founded in 1856, Associação Naval de Lisboa (Lisbon Naval Association) is the oldest sport club of Portugal and one of the 30 oldest yacht clubs in Europe.

The main sports are the sailing and rowing.

External links
 Associação Naval de Lisboa sailing web page
 Associação Naval de Lisboa rowing web page

Lisbon
Yacht clubs in Portugal
Sport in Lisbon
1856 establishments in Portugal